Shrabani Basu is an Indian journalist and historian, and the author of several books including Victoria & Abdul: The True Story of the Queen's Closest Confidant (2010), which was based on the friendship between Queen Victoria and Abdul Karim. It was subsequently adapted into the film Victoria & Abdul (2017). Earlier she authored Spy Princess: The life of Noor Inayat Khan (2006), following which she founded the Noor Inayat Khan Memorial Trust and campaigned for a memorial to Khan, which resulted in the erection of a bust in Gordon Square, London. In 2020, she unveiled a Blue Plaque outside Khan's London home on Taviton Street.

After compiling the stories of Indian men sent to Europe in 1914, she published For King and Another Country (2015), a book describing some of India's contributions in the First World War. Later she wrote a book about how  Arthur Conan Doyle proved the innocence of an Indian lawyer, George Edalji, in the Midlands; The Mystery of the Parsee Lawyer: Arthur Conan Doyle, George Edalji and the case of the foreigner in the English village (2021).

Early life
Shrabani Basu was born in Kolkata and grew up in Dhaka, Kathmandu and Delhi. She studied history at St Stephen’s College, Delhi, and gained a master's degree from Delhi University.

Career
Her career in journalism started in 1983, when she became a trainee journalist for The Times of India in Mumbai. In 1987 she moved to London and worked for the Calcutta-based newspaper Anandabazar Patrika and The Telegraph.

Spy Princess
Basu studied Jean Overton Fuller's biography of Noor Inayat Khan, interviewed Khan's relatives, and extracted data from her SOE personal files, to write Spy Princess: The life of Noor Inayat Khan. It was published in 2006. Following her campaign for a memorial for Noor Inayat Khan in 2010, a bust in her memory was subsequently erected in Gordon Square, London, near Khan's house. Princess Anne unveiled the memorial in 2012. In 2020, Basu unveiled a Blue Plaque that was installed by English Heritage outside Khan's London home on Taviton Street. As of 2021, Spy Princess is being adapted into a TV series, written by Olivia Hetreed, and in consultation with Basu.

Victoria & Abdul
In the 1990s, during her research on the history of curry, she came across the story of Abdul Karim. After carrying out historical research on the subject she wrote Victoria & Abdul: The true story of the Queen's closest confidant, a book based on the friendship between Queen Victoria and Karim. It was then adapted into the film Victoria & Abdul (2017), which featured Dame Judi Dench and Ali Fazal.

The Mystery of the Parsee Lawyer
Her book The Mystery of the Parsee Lawyer, was released in 2021. It describes the story of a young Indian lawyer, George Edalji, who hired Arthur Conan Doyle to prove his innocence.

For King and Another Country
After compiling the stories of Indian men sent to Europe in 1914, she published For King and Another Country (2015), a book describing some of India's contributions in the First World War.

Personal and family
Her dedications made in her books show that Basu's father was Chitta Ranjan Basu. She has two sisters, and two daughters.

Publications

References

External links
Shrabani Basu at IMDb

Living people
Year of birth missing (living people)
Indian journalists
Women historians
Writers from Kolkata
St. Stephen's College, Delhi alumni